Return to the Fractured Planet is an original novel by Dave Stone  featuring the fictional archaeologist Bernice Summerfield. The New Adventures were a spin-off from the long-running British science fiction television series Doctor Who.

External links

1999 British novels
1999 science fiction novels
Virgin New Adventures
Bernice Summerfield novels
British science fiction novels
Novels by Dave Stone